In theoretical physics, the Veneziano amplitude refers to the discovery made in 1968 by Italian theoretical physicist Gabriele Veneziano that the Euler beta function, when interpreted as a scattering amplitude, has many of the features needed to explain the physical properties of strongly interacting mesons, such as symmetry and duality. Conformal symmetry was soon discovered. This discovery can be considered the birth of string theory, as the discovery and invention of string theory came about as a search for a physical model which would give rise to such a scattering amplitude. In particular, the amplitude appears as the four tachyon scattering amplitude in orientated open bosonic string theory. Using Mandelstam variables and the beta function , the amplitude is given by

See also
 Beta function
 Crossing (physics)
 Dual resonance model
 History of string theory
 Regge theory

References

External links
 String Theory and M-Theory, Lecture 6, Video lecture by Leonard Susskind on Veneziano amplitude. (Stanford University)

Theoretical physics
String theory